The 1997 FIS Freestyle World Ski Championships were held between February 6 and February 9 at the Iizuna Kogen Ski Area in Japan. The World Championships featured both men's and women's events in the Moguls, Aerials, and Acro Skiing, and a men's Combined event. This was a test event for the freestyle skiing events that would take place at the Winter Olympics near Nagano the following year.

Results

Men's results

Moguls

Aerials

Acro Skiing

Combined

Women's results

Moguls

Aerials

Acro Skiing

References

External links
 FIS Freestyle Skiing Home
 Results from the FIS

1997
1997 in Japanese sport
1997 in freestyle skiing
Freestyle skiing competitions in Japan